Upper Baddibu was one of the six districts of the North Bank Division of The Gambia. Its main town was Farafenni. The North Bank Division is now the Kerewan Local Government Area, and the former Upper Baddibu District is now divided into an Illiasa District and a Sabach Sanjal District. Its population in the 2003 census, prior to division, was 55,370.

References

North Bank Division
Districts of the Gambia